Li Haonan (born 13 July 1999) is a Chinese basketball player for the Chinese 3x3 national team.

He represented China at the 2020 Summer Olympics.

References

1999 births
Living people
3x3 basketball players at the 2020 Summer Olympics
Chinese men's basketball players
Chinese men's 3x3 basketball players
Olympic 3x3 basketball players of China
People from Fuyang
20th-century Chinese people
21st-century Chinese people